Craig Hutchison (born May 26, 1975) is a former freestyle swimmer from Canada, who competed for his native country at the 2000 Summer Olympics in Sydney, Australia.  His best result was finishing in sixth place in the men's 4x100-metre medley relay event.

See also
 List of Commonwealth Games medallists in swimming (men)

References
 

1975 births
Living people
Canadian male freestyle swimmers
Olympic swimmers of Canada
Swimmers from Montreal
Swimmers at the 1998 Commonwealth Games
Swimmers at the 1999 Pan American Games
Swimmers at the 2000 Summer Olympics
Commonwealth Games medallists in swimming
Commonwealth Games silver medallists for Canada
Commonwealth Games bronze medallists for Canada
Pan American Games competitors for Canada
Medallists at the 1998 Commonwealth Games